Penny station is a railway station in Penny, British Columbia. It is on the Canadian National Railway mainline and serves as a flag stop for Via Rail's Jasper–Prince Rupert train.

The station was built by the Grand Trunk Pacific Railway in 1914. The original building burned down in a 1947 fire and the station building from Lindup, British Columbia was moved to this location. The station building was again moved in 1988 to the Prince George Railway Museum.

Penny no longer receives mail by train. The service was cut off in January 2014.

References 

Via Rail stations in British Columbia
Railway stations in Canada opened in 1914